The West African Club Championship (UFOA Cup), also known as the General Eyadéma Cup, was a West African Club tournament from 1977 to 1999. It was open to league runners-up in the West Africa (or Zone 3) region of the CAF. While the first matches were played of the 2000 tournament, the competition was cancelled before the final, largely for financial reasons. While the intention of the CAF was to revive a national squad tournament in its place, the planned annual CSSA Nations Cup has not been regularly scheduled since. The tournament was resurrected in 2009 to pit each member country's highest team not featuring in the CAF Champions League or the CAF Confederation Cup. The final four was played in December with Togo as the host.

Winners by year
1977 Stade Abidjan, Cote d'Ivoire
1978 ASFA Dakar, Senegal
1979 ASF Police, Senegal
1980 ASF Police, Senegal
1981 Stella Abidjan, Cote d'Ivoire
1982 Sekondi Hasaacas F.C., Ghana
1983 New Nigeria Bank (NNB), Benin City, Nigeria
1984 New Nigeria Bank (NNB), Benin City, Nigeria
1985 Africa Sports, Cote d'Ivoire
1986 Africa Sports, Cote d'Ivoire
1987 Cornerstones F.C., Kumasi, Ghana
1988 ASFAG, Conakry, Guinea
1989 Ranchers Bees, Nigeria
1990 ASEC Abidjan, Cote d'Ivoire
1991 Africa Sports, Cote d'Ivoire
1992 Stade Malien, Mali
1993 Bendel Insurance, Nigeria
1994 Bendel Insurance, Nigeria
1995 Bendel Insurance, Nigeria
1996 ASFAN, Niamey, Niger
1997 Ghapoha, Tema, Ghana
1998 Shooting Stars F.C., Nigeria
1999 ASFA Yennega, Burkina Faso
2009 Horoya AC, Guinea
2010 Sharks F.C., Nigeria
2011 Dynamic Togolais, Togo
2017 AS Tanda, Cote d'Ivoire

References

 
West African Football Union competitions